Soul Patrol may refer to:
 Soul Patrol (fandom), fans of American Idol winner Taylor Hicks
 Soul Patrol (baseball), the outfield players of the 2001 Minnesota Twins season
 Soul Patrol (1978 film), a blaxploitation film
 Soul Patrol (2000 film), a British comedy film starring Sadie Frost and Davinia Taylor
 Soul Patrol, an SECW wrestling team of Norvell Austin and Brickhouse Brown
 Soul Patrol, a fictional group of dead people in The Scream Team
 Soul Patrol, a book about an African-American LRRP in Vietnam written by Ed Emanuel